The 1991–92 Liga Nacional de Fútbol Femenino was the 4th season of the Spanish women's football first division. Añorga won their first title ever.

Teams and locations

League table

Results

References

1991-92
Spa
1
women